Edward Pacyaya Malecdan (6 February 1949 – 28 April 2018) was a Filipino Episcopalian bishop. He served as the Prime Bishop of the Episcopal Church in the Philippines from 2009 to 2014.

He died on 28 April 2018. He had previously been Dean of St Andrews Theological Seminary (SATS) in the Philippines. He was Bishop of the Northern Philippines in 2000, when the Episcopal Diocese of Northeastern Luzon was created.

References 

1949 births
2018 deaths
Filipino Episcopalians
Anglican bishops in the Philippines
Episcopal bishops of Northern Philippines
Prime bishops of the Episcopal Church in the Philippines
20th-century Anglican bishops in Asia
21st-century Anglican bishops in Asia
Filipino bishops